Semaphorin 7A, GPI membrane anchor (John Milton Hagen blood group) (SEMA7A) also known as CD108 (Cluster of Differentiation 108), is a human gene.

SEMA7A is a membrane-bound semaphorin that associates with cell surfaces via a glycosylphosphatidylinositol (GPI) linkage. SEMA7A is also known as the John-Milton-Hagen (JMH) blood group antigen, an 80-kD glycoprotein expressed on activated lymphocytes and erythrocytes.[supplied by OMIM] SEMA7A is expressed in various adult tissues such as adipose, colon, esophagus, heart, brain, spleen, testis, lung, ovary, and uterus.

Development

SEMA7A promotes axonal growth and is involved in mesoderm derived somite formation. Murine embryonic Sema7A expression is highest on day 7, which is indicative of its role on the differentiation of germ layer structure. Embryonic Sema7A expression is noticeable at all developmental stages as well as in the newborn and adult thymus, indicative of a development T-cell role. In wild type neurons, addition of Sema7A under in vitro conditions promotes elongation and branching in a dose dependent manner. Unlike the majority of semaphorins, SEMA7A enhances axonal growth and is imperative for proper embryonic axonal tract formation. Limited expression of SEMA7A is found in the hindbrain as opposed to an abundance of SEMA7A expression found in both the cranial and trunk neural crest cells, which indicates an involvement in migration and differentiation. Sema7A -/- mice show defects in olfactory tract development.

Tumorigenesis
In normal breast tissue, mRNA expression of SEMA7A is low or not expressed, but activation to re-express SEMA7A occurs in these adult tissues to cause pleiotropic effects which increase tumorigenesis. Tumor cell growth, EMT, lung metastasis and angiogenesis have been linked to increased Sema7a expression in murine models. Increased SEMA7A expression correlates with poor prognosis in breast cancer patients. Tumors increase SEMA7A expression in an involuting environment, but knockout of SEMA7a in mouse models undergoing involution decreases lymphangiogenesis.

Genetics

This protein is known to have eight variants in the extracellular region: seven lie within the Sema domain and one within the PSI domain.

Molecular biology

This protein forms dimers.

Notes

This protein acts as a receptor for the malaria parasite Plasmodium falciparum.

See also
 Cluster of differentiation

References

Further reading

External links
 
 John Milton Hagen blood group system in the BGMUT blood group antigen gene mutation database
 PDBe-KB provides an overview of all the structure information available in the PDB for Human Semaphorin-7A

Clusters of differentiation
Transfusion medicine
Blood antigen systems